Tricholosporum porphyrophyllum is a species of fungus in the family Tricholomataceae. It is found in Asia.

Taxonomy
The species was originally described as Tricholoma porphyrophyllum in 1938 by the Japanese mycologist Sanshi Imai. Gaston Guzman transferred it to Tricholosporum in 1975, but this was deemed invalid according to the rules of botanical nomenclature, so Tim Baroni made the transfer official in a 1982 publication.

References

External links

Photo
Mushroom Observer - Tricholosporum porphyrophyllum

porphyrophyllum
Fungi described in 1938
Fungi of Asia